The Kris Wu rape case is a sex scandal involving Chinese-Canadian rapper and actor Kris Wu which has aroused much controversy as it is considered a manifestation of Xi Jingping's governance ideology, the integration of law and morality.

Du Meizhu, a 19-year-old Chinese woman, released a post on her Weibo account on July 8, 2021, accusing him of raping her and more than 30 other young women and girls (including two minors).  The number of victims was changed to 24 and finalized to 8 in her subsequent posts. Wu denied all accusations but lost sponsorships, had his social media accounts and music removed from Chinese platforms.

On 25 November 2022, Wu was convicted on two charges, raping "three drunken women" in his home in the months of November and December 2020,  and having sexual activities in a group, with two other women in his home on 1 July 2018. The court imposed a fixed term of 13 years after considerations of 11.5 years in prison for the first charge, and one year and ten months for the second charge, followed by deportation from China. A Canadian embassy official was present at the announcement of the verdict, not at court trial. He was also fined  for tax evasion.

People involved 
The following people were involved:
Kris Wu: Chinese-Canadian, born in 1990, actor, singer, record producer, rapper, and model.
Du Meizhu: Chinese, born in 2002, student of Vocational and Technical College of Communication University of China (2020), major in film and television direction, who disclosed herself to be a witness testifying at court
Two anonymous women as witnesses

Allegations 
On July 8, 2021, 19-year-old university student Du Meizhu accused Wu of sexual misconduct on Weibo, a Chinese social media platform. In her allegation, she states that she was in a relationship with Wu, and he raped her after forcing her to drink alcohol. She said that she was 17 at the time of the assault. Alongside her post, she also included pictures and message screenshots to back up her claim after receiving threats from Wu's fans. When Du made her allegations, the police initially discredited her as a fame-seeker.

Following the incident, Du claimed that she was paid hush money by Wu's agency but finally got the courage to speak out two years later. Du also included in another post that there were more instances of Wu getting women drunk and then raping them. She later said that she wasn't the first or last victim after more women (including two minors) had reached out to her to share similar experiences of being lured by Wu.

On August 8, 2021, one alleged underage rape victim from Los Angeles shared her story, which started with her attending one of Wu's drinking parties. She told her lawyer Jing Wang that: "It's an open secret that he [Wu] selects concubines among international students". She said she saw this first-hand when Wu's assistant invited her to a gathering. She stated that before the girls could enter the venue, they had to turn in their phones to prevent photos and videos from being recorded.

Below are some of the accusations listed by Du which come from her Weibo posts:

 Wu never took any safety precautions whenever he raped the girls
 Wu would frequently "pick up" young and pretty fan-girls, bring them over to what he claimed to be a mini fan convention, and tell them that there were more fans coming. The site of the "convention" would turn out to be a hotel, and when they reached their destination they would realise that they were alone in a room with Wu.
 Du received a total of CNY 500 thousand (approximately USD$ 78 thousand) as hush money. Du provided a video of the transaction and said that she is in the process of returning the money.
 Du had been invited to his home under the pretence of a work opportunity, where she was pressured to drink alcohol and later awoke naked on his bed, discovering she had been raped.
 Wu had a sexually transmitted infection while seeing a girl and that he forced her to get an abortion.
 7 other women had told her that Wu had raped them after using the same method he had used on Du, promising jobs and other opportunities.

After she was interviewed by NetEase, a major news portal, the allegations gained further attention. Following the accusations, Du also responded to Wu's legal team and said that she and the other victims would hand over their evidence to the police in due course.

On his personal Weibo account, Wu denied supplying Du with alcohol, and also rejected other allegations that he had enticed girls to have sex in return for benefits, raped girls while they were unconscious, and had sex with minors. He also announced that his company would take legal actions, calling the accusations "malicious rumours".

Trial 
On July 31, 2021, Wu was detained by the Beijing Chaoyang District police on suspicion of rape after "repeatedly seducing young women into having sex", the police said in an official statement.

China's top law enforcement agency, the ruling Communist Party's Central Political and Legal Affairs Commission, commented on Wu's detention, posting on Weibo: "On Chinese land, it is necessary to abide by Chinese laws. We do not wrong; we do not indulge. We take facts as the basis and the law as the criterion." 

The People's Daily (the primary newspaper owned by the Central Committee of the Chinese Communist Party), used the arrest to warn that foreign citizenship was not any protection against violating Chinese laws after questions aroused whether Wu's Canadian citizenship would affect his punishment:"On Chinese soil, everyone is equal before the law. No-one has any amulet. Star aura cannot protect it, fans cannot protect it, and foreign passports cannot protect it. No-one has the privilege of trespassing the law."

— State broadcaster CCTV in an online commentaryOn August 16, 2021, he was formally arrested over allegations of rape. The statement from the prosecutor's office in Beijing's Chaoyang said Wu's arrest for suspected rape was formally approved, but it did not offer any details on the charges.

On November 25, 2022, Wu was convicted of rape, and what Reuters described as "assembling a crowd to engage in sexual promiscuity" with two women in his home on 1 July 2018, . The court imposed a prison sentence of one year and ten months for the crime and another eleven years six months for raping three drunken women in his home between the months of November and December 2020, a fine of CNY 600 million (approximately   million) for the tax evasion, and said he would be deported from China. Reuters reported that in such cases, the deportation would probably only take place after his prison sentence is served.

Influence

Judiciary
Wu's arrest came shortly after government body overseeing performing arts issued a new set of regulatory guidelines to regulate the behavior of performers and celebrities, which require that they "love the motherland" and create art that "serves the people and socialism".

Works removed 
On the evening of August 1, 2021, QQ Music and NetEase Music removed all of Kris Wu's music from the shelves. The official Weibo account of big-budget costume drama The Golden Hairpin, which stars Wu, deleted all posts related to him, leaving only a poster featuring the show's supporting characters. The Golden Hairpin, produced by Tencent Video, is Wu's first TV drama. Wu's account on the short video platform Douyin was also blocked and its followers have been removed, and his Weibo profile has been taken down due to "Complaints in violating the rules and regulations of Weibo's Community Convention".

Brands and companies 
Numerous companies have followed suit in ousting Wu: brand endorsement deals were ended; social media posts that featured him were removed, and he was later blacklisted by several networks. Below is a non-exhaustive list of entities that have either condemned Wu or disassociated themselves from him:

 Bulgari
 Bestore
 China Media Group
 Ethereal Sound
 Honor of Kings
 KANS Cosmetics
 Kiehl's
 Lancôme
 Liby Detergent
 Louis Vuitton
 L'Oréal Men
 Master Kong Iced Tea
 Porsche
 Seeyoung Haircare
 Tempo
 Tencent
Tuborg Beer 
Vatti

Prior relevant laws and regulations in Mainland China

Ban of "notorious" artists
In September 2014, the National Radio and Television Administration issued the "Notice of the National Radio and Television Administration Office on Strengthening the Management of the Production and Distribution of Radio and Television Programs, Film and TV Dramas, and Online Audio-visual Programs". Artists listed in this order are called "notorious" and could face permanent boycott from the industry.

Relevant laws and regulations 

According to Article 236 of the Criminal Law of the People's Republic of China, the crime of rape refers to the act of using violence, coercion or other means against a woman's will to forcibly have sexual intercourse with her, or deliberately have sexual intercourse with a girl under the age of fourteen. Anyone who rapes a woman by violence, coercion or other means shall be sentenced to fixed-term imprisonment of no less than three years but no more than ten years. Whoever commits adultery with a girl under the age of fourteen shall be punished as severely as rape, up to the death penalty. Anyone who commits a joint offense by two or more persons shall be sentenced to fixed-term imprisonment of more than ten years, life imprisonment or a death sentence. In addition, according to the territorial principle, if the crime occurred in China, the same sentences apply regardless of the nationality of the offender.

Because Wu is a Canadian citizen, a conviction by the judiciary of China makes him eligible for deportation from China, since according to Article 35 of the Criminal Law of the People's Republic of China, foreigners who commit crimes can face deportation. Some publications pointed out that the Chinese-American lawyer Bao Yuming, who was previously convicted of "violating social ethics and public order and good customs" in his sexual assault case, was deported.

See also 
 Edison Chen photo scandal
 Harvey Weinstein sexual abuse cases
 Me Too movement (China)

Notes

References 

2021 scandals
Sex scandals
Scandals in China
Rape in China
Rape in the 2020s